South Jeolla Province (Jeollanam-do) is divided into 5 cities (si) and 17 counties (gun). They're also divided into 31 towns (eup), 198 townships (myeon), and 67 neighborhoods (dong).

Table

Map

Former

References

See also 
 List of cities in South Korea

Jeolla, South
Jeolla, South